Monaem Khan Raju (born 7 July 1990) is a Bangladeshi footballer who plays as a defensive midfielder for Bangladesh Police FC in the Bangladesh Premier League.

He also represented the Bangladesh national football team from 2011 to 2016.

Career
In 2010, after his debut season with Feni SC, Raju was included in the 39-men preliminary squad for the 2010 South Asian Games by Croatian coach Zoran Đorđević. However, he did not make the final 23-men squad, and Bangladesh U23 ended up clinching gold in the tournament.

On 29 May 2011, Raju scored a brace for Sheikh Jamal DC in a 2–0 victory over Arambagh KS. However, the season ended up being a disappointment for the club as they failed to retain the league title, finishing in seventh place.

On 29 August 2013, Raju was added to the 2013 SAFF Championship squad by Dutch coach Lodewijk de Kruif, after captain Mamunul Islam and star midfielder Sohel Rana were deemed not fit enough. However, Raju's inclusion was not accepted by the South Asian Football Federation, due to him not being a member of the previously announced 30-men preliminary squad. Bangladesh Football Federation's decision of including Raju after the original squad already announced, was later heavily criticised by local media, after Bangladesh finished bottom of their group during the tournament.

On 15 January 2016, Raju was named the "Man of the Match" during Bangladesh's encounter with Nepal at the 2016 Bangabandhu Cup. However, after a goalless draw Raju expressed his disappointment during the post-match interview by stating "This is the first time I have become the best player in an international match. A victory would have been a big achievement. But that didn't happen."

On 24 May 2019, while playing for Chittagong Abahani Limited, Raju and four other local footballers were accused of match-fixing.

Career statistics

International

References

External links 
 
 

1990 births
Living people
Bangladeshi footballers
Association football midfielders
Abahani Limited (Chittagong) players
Sheikh Jamal Dhanmondi Club players
Feni SC players
Sheikh Russel KC players
Bangladesh Police FC players
Bangladesh international footballers
Bangladesh Football Premier League players